Bishop is a city in Nueces County, Texas, United States. The population was 3,134 in the 2010 census, down from 3305 in 2000 census.

History
Bishop is a small town in south Texas, it was a planned town from its beginning. In 1910, F.Z. Bishop, an insurance agent turned promoter, acquired  of land in South Texas along the railroad line and laid out a model community surrounded by farm tracts.

Bishop laid out zoned business, industrial and residential districts and built a water and power system. In just two years, the town grew to a population of 1,200. Bishop closed his operation as World War I started.

The city was built on agriculture as its economic mainstay. The economy is also bolstered by a large chemical plant opened in 1945 by Celanese Corporation of America.

Geography

Bishop is located at  (27.585178, –97.799437).

It is located on U.S. Highway 77 (Future Interstate 69E) and Farm-to-Market Road 70, Bishop is located eight miles north of Kingsville and about thirty miles southwest of Corpus Christi.

Climate

The climate in this area is characterized by hot, humid summers and generally mild to cool winters.  According to the Köppen Climate Classification system, Bishop has a humid subtropical climate, abbreviated "Cfa" on climate maps.

Demographics

2020 census

As of the 2020 United States census, there were 3,174 people, 1,104 households, and 902 families residing in the city.

2000 census
As of the census of 2000, there were 3,305 people, 1,132 households, and 868 families residing in the city. The population density was 1,394.1 people per square mile (538.4/km2). There were 1,269 housing units at an average density of 535.3 per square mile (206.7/km2). The racial makeup of the city was 84.11% White, 0.97% African American, 0.57% Native American, 0.12% Asian, 0.06% Pacific Islander, 11.71% from other races, and 2.45% from two or more races. Hispanic or Latino of any race were 60.00% of the population.

There were 1,132 households, out of which 38.3% had children under the age of 18 living with them, 58.9% were married couples living together, 14.3% had a female householder with no husband present, and 23.3% were non-families. 20.4% of all households were made up of individuals, and 11.5% had someone living alone who was 65 years of age or older. The average household size was 2.92 and the average family size was 3.41.

In the city, the population was spread out, with 30.0% under the age of 18, 8.6% from 18 to 24, 27.2% from 25 to 44, 21.3% from 45 to 64, and 12.9% who were 65 years of age or older. The median age was 34 years. For every 100 females, there were 93.0 males. For every 100 females age 18 and over, there were 89.3 males.

The median income for a household in the city was $35,434, and the median income for a family was $41,250. Males had a median income of $30,469 versus $22,316 for females. The per capita income for the city was $14,974. About 12.2% of families and 14.1% of the population were below the poverty line, including 17.6% of those under age 18 and 13.5% of those ages 65 or over.

Education

The City of Bishop is served by the Bishop Consolidated Independent School District, which has five schools:
 Bishop High (Grades 9–12)
 Luehrs Junior High (Grades 6–8)
 Bishop Elementary (Grades 4–5)
 Bishop Primary School (Grades PK–3)

Petronila Elementary (Grades PK–5) 

 Bishop Primary (Grades PK–3)

The BCISD now has a new high school that opened in the fall of 2010.

Transportation
The Bishop Municipal Airport is located three nautical miles (4 mi, 6 km) northeast of Bishop's central business district.]

Culture

In popular culture 
Ronnie Bull, a running back for the Chicago Bears and the Philadelphia Eagles, grew up in Bishop, TX and played football for Bishop High School.

Season 2, Episode 2 of Person of Interest, "Bad Code" takes place in a fictional representation of Bishop, TX, which is revealed as the birthplace of the hacker known as Root.

See also

 List of cities in Texas

References

External links

 Bishop Chamber of Commerce
 

Cities in Texas
Cities in Nueces County, Texas
Cities in the Corpus Christi metropolitan area